The 1980–81 Los Angeles Kings season, was the Kings' 14th season in the National Hockey League. It saw the Kings make it to the playoffs, losing in the preliminary round to the New York Rangers.

Offseason

Regular season

Final standings

Schedule and results

Playoffs

Player statistics

Awards and records

Transactions
The Kings were involved in the following transactions during the 1980–81 season.

Trades

Free agent signings

Draft picks
Los Angeles's draft picks at the 1980 NHL Entry Draft held at the Montreal Forum in Montreal, Quebec.

Farm teams

See also
1980–81 NHL season

References

External links

Los Angeles Kings seasons
Los Angeles Kings
Los Angeles Kings
National Hockey League All-Star Game hosts
Los Angeles Kings
Los Angeles Kings